Vincent Desmond is a Lagos-based Nigerian LGBTQ advocate, and writer. He is also the chief-editor and publisher of A Nasty Boy fashion magazine, founded by Richard Akuson, a Nigerian journalist and lawyer in February 2017.

Desmond has written for print and online magazines. He was previously a writer at BellaNaija and an editor at Zikoko, a youth culture publication in Nigeria.

Personal life 
Desmond is openly queer.

In 2020, he shared his view on childbirth and parenting on his micro blogging site:
"My beef with having kids is that I think having kids is an inherently very selfish thing. Selfish on the part of the parents because you're bringing in a whole human and forcing them to live and participate in life and society. And for what? Bragging rights? Because you feel it's time."

Awards 
In 2020, he was awarded the Young Trailblazer of the Year by TIERS Nigeria.

In 2021, he was listed among "The 150 Most Interesting Nigerians in Culture in 2019" by RED Media Africa, and was nominated for The Future Awards Africa Prize For Leading Conversation.

References 

Living people
Nigerian LGBT rights activists
21st-century Nigerian writers
Nigerian LGBT writers
Queer writers
1999 births